Blyth Harbour Wind Farm is a coastal wind farm located in East Bedlington along the East Pier of the Port of Blyth.
Commissioned in January 1993 it consists of nine 0.3 MW WindMaster turbines giving a total capacity of 2.7 MW. It was developed by AMEC Wind and is owned by Hainsford Developments (Blyth Harbour) Limited.

Repowering

In January 2008 consent was granted to replace the existing nine turbines with seven new ones.

As of September 2012, the first new turbine became operational, producing up to 3.4 MW of power (more than the original nine turbines combined).  The turbine is a REpower 3.4M104, with a 76 m hub height.

References

Wind farms in England
Power stations in North East England
Buildings and structures in Northumberland